Mecha is a rural locality (a selo) in Osintsevskoye Rural Settlement, Kishertsky District, Perm Krai, Russia. The population was 389 as of 2010. There are 5 streets.

Geography 
Mecha is located 30 km southeast of Ust-Kishert (the district's administrative centre) by road. Dom otkykha 'Krasny Yar' is the nearest rural locality.

References 

Rural localities in Kishertsky District